Mary Lou Zeeman is a British mathematician at Bowdoin College in the US, where she is R. Wells Johnson Professor of Mathematics. She specializes in dynamical systems and their application to mathematical biology; she helped found the SIAM Activity Group on the Mathematics of Planet Earth, and co-directs the Mathematics and Climate Research Network.

Zeeman is the daughter of British mathematician Christopher Zeeman.
She was educated at the University of Oxford, and earned her PhD in 1989 from the University of California, Berkeley under the supervision of Morris Hirsch. Before moving to Bowdoin in 2006, she spent 15 years on the faculty of the University of Texas at San Antonio.

References

External links
Home page

Year of birth missing (living people)
Living people
20th-century American mathematicians
21st-century American mathematicians
British mathematicians
American women mathematicians
Theoretical biologists
Alumni of the University of Oxford
UC Berkeley College of Letters and Science alumni
University of Texas at San Antonio faculty
Bowdoin College faculty
20th-century women mathematicians
21st-century women mathematicians
20th-century American women
21st-century American women